Ignaz Maybaum (2 March 1897, Vienna – 1976) was a rabbi and 20th-century liberal Jewish theologian.

Life 
Maybaum was born in Vienna in 1897. He studied in Berlin at the Hochschule für die Wissenschaft des Judentums, where he was ordained as a rabbi in 1926. He took rabbinic posts in Bingen, Frankfurt an der Oder and Berlin. He was a disciple of Franz Rosenzweig.

In 1935 he was arrested by the Gestapo, spending six weeks in prison before being released. Leaving Germany in 1938, Maybaum was given work in the United Synagogue by the British Chief Rabbi, Joseph Hertz. His mother and sisters were killed in the Holocaust.

In 1949 he became rabbi of Edgware and District Reform Synagogue. From 1956 until his retirement in 1963, he lectured in homiletics and theology at Leo Baeck College. He was also active in inter-religious dialogue. His students include Nicholas de Lange.

Holocaust theology 
Maybaum wrote many reflections on Judaism, Christianity, the Holocaust and Zionism. He also wrote on Islam. He is most frequently remembered for his controversial view in The Face of God After Auschwitz (1965) that the suffering of Jews in the Holocaust was vicarious atonement for the sins of the rest of the world.  He was connecting the Jewish people to the figure of the "suffering servant" of Isaiah 52 and 53 in the Tanakh (the Christian Old Testament). In the same work he employed Christian imagery, speaking of Auschwitz as the new Golgotha and the gas chambers as replacing the cross.

Works 
 Parteibefreites Judentum (1935)
 Neue Jugend und Alter Glaube (1936)
 Man and Catastrophe (1941)
 Synagogue and Society: Jewish-Christian Collaboration in the Defence of Western Civilization (1944)
 The Jewish Home (1945)
 The Jewish Mission (1949)
 Jewish Existence (1960)
 The Faith of the Jewish Diaspora (1962)
 The Face of God After Auschwitz (1965)
 Trialogue Between Jew, Christian, and Muslim (1973)
 Happiness Outside the State (1980)
 Ignaz Maybaum: A Reader, Nicholas de Lange (ed.), New York and Oxford: Berghahn Books (2001)

References 

 Ignaz Maybaum: A Reader, Nicholas de Lange (ed.), New York: Berghahn Books
 "Ignaz Maybaum" in Cohn-Sherbok, D. (ed.), Fifty Key Jewish Thinkers, London: Routledge, pp. 90–91
  'Iganz Maybaum and the Call for an Anti-Nazi Crusade', a paper presented by Isaac Hershkowitz, Bar-Ilan University, Israel

1897 births
1976 deaths
20th-century German theologians
20th-century German rabbis
Austro-Hungarian emigrants to Germany
Austrian Reform rabbis
British Reform rabbis
British sermon writers
British theologians
Christian and Jewish interfaith dialogue
Rabbis from Vienna
German Jewish theologians
German male non-fiction writers
German Reform rabbis
Holocaust studies
Holocaust theology
Islamic and Jewish interfaith dialogue
Jewish emigrants from Nazi Germany to the United Kingdom
People associated with Leo Baeck College
University of Marburg alumni
Writers from Vienna
Writers on Zionism